Cephalopods, which include squids and octopuses, vary enormously in size. Living species range in mass more than three-billion-fold, or across nine orders of magnitude, from the lightest hatchlings to the heaviest adults. Certain cephalopod species are also noted for having individual body parts of exceptional size. The giant and colossal squids, for example, have the largest known eyes among living animals.

Cephalopods were at one time the largest of all organisms on Earth, and numerous species of comparable size to the largest present day squids are known from the fossil record, including enormous examples of ammonoids, belemnoids, nautiloids, orthoceratoids, teuthids, and vampyromorphids. In terms of mass, the largest of all known cephalopods were likely the giant shelled ammonoids and endocerid nautiloids, though perhaps still second to the largest living cephalopods when considering tissue mass alone.

Giant cephalopods have fascinated humankind since time immemorial. The earliest surviving records are perhaps those of Aristotle and Pliny the Elder, both of whom described squids of very large size. Tales of giant squid have been common among mariners since ancient times, and may have inspired the monstrous kraken of Nordic legend, said to be as large as an island and capable of engulfing and sinking any ship. Similar tentacled sea monsters are known from other parts of the globe, including the Akkorokamui of Japan and Te Wheke-a-Muturangi of New Zealand. The Lusca of the Caribbean and Scylla in Greek mythology may also derive from giant squid sightings, as might eyewitness accounts of other sea monsters such as sea serpents.

Size, and particularly maximum size, continues to be one of the most interesting aspects of cephalopod science to both the general public and researchers in the field. This is evidenced by the regular coverage given to the giant squid—and more recently, the colossal squid—in both the popular press and academic literature. Due to its status as a charismatic megafaunal species, the giant squid has been proposed as an emblematic animal for marine invertebrate conservation. Life-sized models of the giant squid are a common sight in natural history museums around the world, and preserved specimens are much sought after for display.

Cephalopods vastly larger than either giant or colossal squids have been postulated at various times. Perhaps the most notable of these is the so-called St. Augustine Monster, a large carcass weighing several tonnes that washed ashore on the United States coast near St. Augustine, Florida, in 1896. Zoologist Addison Emery Verrill of Yale, at the time the country's foremost authority on cephalopods, was initially convinced that it represented a previously unknown species of gigantic octopus, and even proposed for it the scientific name Octopus giganteus. However, having received tissue samples he quickly retracted his original opinion, identifying it instead as the remains of a whale. Nevertheless, the possible existence of such a gargantuan octopus was taken seriously well into the 20th century, until reanalyses in 1995 and 2004 of the original tissue samples—together with those of other similar carcasses—showed conclusively that they were all masses of the collagenous matrix of whale blubber.

Cephalopods of enormous size have featured prominently in fiction. Some of the best known examples include the giant squid from Jules Verne's 1870 novel Twenty Thousand Leagues Under the Sea and its various film adaptations; the giant octopus from the 1955 monster movie It Came from Beneath the Sea; and the giant squid from Peter Benchley's 1991 novel Beast and the TV film adaptation of the same name.

Size in teuthology

Mantle length

Mantle length (ML) is the standard size measure for coleoid cephalopods (shell diameter being more common for nautiluses) and is almost universally reported in the scientific literature. The mantle is the cephalopod's "body", lying posterior to the head and enclosing the visceral mass and mantle cavity, the latter being used for locomotion by jet propulsion. Unless otherwise indicated, mantle length is measured dorsally over the midline of the mantle (sometimes specified as dorsal mantle length, DML). It is a straight-line measure, not measured over the curve of the body. In Decapodiformes (ten-limbed cephalopods), mantle length is measured from the anterior edge of the mantle (near the head), to the posterior end of the mantle or the apex of the united fins, whichever is longer. In Octopodiformes (eight-limbed cephalopods), the anterior edge of the mantle is not clearly delimited dorsally due to advanced head–mantle fusion, and mantle length is therefore taken from the midpoint between the eyes to the posterior end of the mantle. When ventral mantle length is meant instead of dorsal this is always specified as such and abbreviated VML.

As an indication of overall size, mantle length is generally considered more reliable than total length because cephalopod limbs may easily be stretched beyond their natural length and are often damaged or missing in preserved specimens (this is particularly true of the long tentacles of many squid species). Nevertheless, mantle length is not equally applicable to all species. Certain benthic octopuses such as Callistoctopus ornatus are able to elongate and retract their mantles and therefore mantle length measurements, even when taken from a live specimen, may vary considerably. Another problematic case is that of the gelatinous cirroteuthids, whose weakly muscled mantles are prone to substantial shrinkage during preservation. The interocular distance may be a more reliable standard for this group.

Total length
Total length (TL) is measured along the dorsal midline with the limbs outstretched and in line with the body axis. It is the greatest measurable extent of a specimen from the posterior end of the mantle or fins (or tail, if present) to the apex of the longest limb. It is recommended that arms and tentacles be measured in a relaxed state so as not to exaggerate their length, but historically this practice was not always followed and some of the more extreme published giant squid measurements have been attributed to artificial lengthening of the tentacles. Although total length is often mentioned in relation to the largest cephalopod species, it is otherwise seldom used in teuthology. As with mantle length, it is a straight-line measure.

Total length is not to be confused with arm span—also known as arm spread, radial span, or radial spread—which may be much larger and is often reported for octopuses (for which the arms usually constitute the vast majority of the length). In squids, total length is inclusive of the feeding tentacles, which in some species may be longer than the mantle, head, and arms combined (chiroteuthids such as Asperoteuthis acanthoderma being a prime example).

A related measure is standard length (SL), which is the combined length of the mantle, head, and arms, excluding the often long feeding tentacles. This measure is particularly useful for species such as the giant squid, where almost the entire bulk of the animal takes up less than half of its total length.

Mass
Mass (often abbreviated WT for 'weight') is reported far less frequently than either mantle or total length, and accurate records do not exist for all of the large cephalopod species. It can also vary widely depending on the state of the specimen at the time of weighing (for example, whether it was measured live or dead, wet or dry, frozen or thawed, pre- or post-fixation, with or without egg mass, and so on).

Methods of size determination
In contrast to the vast majority of living cephalopods, which are wholly soft-bodied, size determination of the few surviving shelled species (in terms of shell diameter) is comparatively straightforward and can be accomplished with a high level of precision. Whatever the type of cephalopod, in the absence of whole specimens, size can often be estimated from only partial remains. For example, cephalopod beaks can be used for mantle length, total length and body mass estimation, and this method has notably been used to estimate the maximum size of the colossal squid. The lower rostral length (LRL) of the beak is often used for this purpose. The rostral length of the lower and upper beaks is the standard measure of beak size in Decapodiformes; hood length is preferred for Octopodiformes.

Mantle length has been estimated from video recordings of squid in the wild.

Early life stages

Hatchlings

Hatchlings of the giant Pacific octopus (Enteroctopus dofleini)—one of the two largest octopus species—weigh  on average.

Smallest adult size
Idiosepius thailandicus is perhaps the smallest of all, with females averaging  in mantle length and males .

Other tiny species include members of the bobtail squid family Sepiolidae; the myopsid squid genera Australiteuthis and Pickfordiateuthis; the oegopsid squid genera Abralia and Abraliopsis; the pygmy cuttlefish Sepia pulchra; and the ram's horn squid, Spirula spirula.

Male dwarfism

The octopod superfamily Argonautoidea is characterised by markedly dwarfed males. The four extant genera of the group are Argonauta, Haliphron, Ocythoe, and Tremoctopus, all of which are exclusively pelagic. The greatest disparity in the size of the sexes is seen in the blanket octopuses of the genus Tremoctopus. Norman et al. This is the most extreme sexual size dimorphism known among non-microscopic animals, with mature females being at least 10,000 times heavier than males, and likely up to 40,000 times heavier. The related genera Argonauta and Ocythoe have similarly small males, but the females are not nearly as large as those of Tremoctopus, and the size dimorphism is therefore less pronounced.

Extinct taxa

Numerous species of so-called micromorphic ammonites are known.  Maximites from the Upper Carboniferous is the smallest known ammonoid. Adult specimens reached only  in shell diameter.

Maximum size

Scientifically validated records

Squids are the largest living cephalopods in terms of each of mantle length, total length, and mass, with the largest species by at least two of these measures being the colossal squid, Mesonychoteuthis hamiltoni. Cirrate (finned) octopods can also reach a large size, with the largest captured specimen likely being a Cirrothauma magna of  total length and  mantle length, though observations from submersibles suggest that members of this group can exceed  in total length. 

Cephalopods of comparable size to the largest present day squid are known from fossil remains, including enormous examples of ammonoids, belemnoids, nautiloids, orthoceratoids, teuthids, and vampyromorphids.

Colossal squid (Mesonychoteuthis hamiltoni)

Though a substantial number of colossal squid (Mesonychoteuthis hamiltoni) remains have been recorded (Xavier et al., 1999 collated 188 geographical positions for whole or partial specimens caught by commercial and scientific fisheries), very few adult or subadult animals have ever been documented, making it difficult to estimate the maximum size of the species. McClain et al. (2015) stated that only 12 "complete" specimens were known.
The largest known complete specimen of the colossal squid was a mature female captured in the Ross Sea in February 2007. It is likely that the specimen, and particularly its tentacles, shrank considerably post mortem as a result of dehydration, having been kept in a freezer for 14 months. (As reported by the Museum of New Zealand Te Papa Tongarewa, specimens of Nototodarus sloanii, the New Zealand arrow squid, can shrink by as much as 22% when dehydrated with alcohol solutions.) The colossal squid specimen contracted by a further 5% after several years in preservative fluid (first formalin and later propylene glycol).

Beaks recovered from sperm whale stomachs indicate the existence of animals surpassing even the 2007 Ross Sea specimen. By comparison, the largest known colossal squid beak from a sperm whale stomach measured  in LRL. However, the scaling relationship for this species shows considerable latitude, as demonstrated by a beak of  LRL extracted from an animal weighing only .

Giant squid (Architeuthis dux)

The maximum size of the giant squid (Architeuthis dux) has long been a subject of both popular debate and academic inquiry. Unlike the colossal squid, the giant squid is known from a substantial number of mature specimens. The total number of recorded specimens (across all developmental stages) approaches a thousand, with approximately 700 documented , of which around 460 had been measured in some way. This number has since increased substantially, with 57 specimens recorded from Japanese waters during an exceptional 15-month period between 2014 and 2015.

Of the nearly 100 specimens examined by Clyde Roper, the largest was " long". O'Shea has stated that, given the available evidence, the highest upper bound he would consider plausible for the giant squid's total length would be , and that the likelihood that there exist 20-metre giant squid is "so exceedingly remote that you couldn't justify the effort in writing about it".

Including the head and arms but excluding the tentacles (standard length, SL), the species very rarely exceeds  according to O'Shea & Bolstad (2008). Paxton (2016a) considers  to be the greatest reliably measured SL, based on a specimen reported by Verrill (1880a:192), and considers specimens of  SL or more to be "very probable", but these conclusions have been criticised by giant squid experts. Discredited weights of as much as a tonne or more are not uncommon in older literature (see below).

Other squid taxa

The third-heaviest extant squid species is Taningia danae, also known as the Dana octopus squid. The largest well documented specimen is a 160 cm ML mature female reported by Roper & Vecchione (1993) from the North Atlantic. Roper & Vecchione (1993) were however consistent in their use of the 61.4 kg figure. Another similarly large specimen—a female weighing —was reported from northern Spanish waters by González et al. (2003:297) (see also initial reports). In July 2010, a sperm whale was photographed off the Azorean island of Faial with a large squid—likely T. danae—in its mouth.

There exist numerous published records of large individuals of this species.

The Humboldt squid (Dosidicus gigas), also known as the 'jumbo squid', grows to a maximum mantle length of at least , if not . The largest animals are found off the western coast of South America; northern populations reach  ML, and in general  ML is more typical for the species. There are anecdotal reports of much larger individual animals, including from diver Scott Cassell, who has dived with Humboldt squid over 300 times (reportedly more than any other person).

Kondakovia longimana, sometimes known as the giant warty squid, is a little known species with a circum-Antarctic distribution in the Southern Ocean.

Largest octopi

Norman et al. (2014:124) accept a maximum weight of at least , which approximates the  reported for a specimen caught off Santa Barbara, California, in 1945, of which photographic evidence survives. No specimens approaching this size have been reported since the middle of the 20th century, with recent specimens very rarely exceeding . It is possible that the maximum size of the species has decreased over this period, perhaps due to bioaccumulation of toxicants (see below).

This specimen, the largest of this species and possibly of all octopuses, was the first validated record of Haliphron from the South Pacific.

Extinct taxa

Certain extinct cephalopods rivalled or even exceeded the size of the largest living species. In particular, the subclass Ammonoidea is known to have included a considerable number of species that may be considered "giant" (defined by Stevens, 1988 as those exceeding  in shell diameter). The largest confirmed ammonite, a specimen of Parapuzosia seppenradensis discovered in a German quarry in 1895, measures  in diameter, though its living chamber is largely missing. In 1971 a portion of an ammonite possibly surpassing this specimen was reportedly found in a brickyard in Bottrop, western Germany.

Heteromorph ammonites are known to have exceeded  in length also, but since their shells were uncoiled to varying degrees, they were overall much smaller than the largest non-heteromorphs. The greatest lengths of all were reached by the orthocones of endocerid nautiloids such as Cameroceras and Endoceras, which may have exceeded , although their maximum size is uncertain; while the largest well documented endocerid fossil is likely the 3-metre-long shell fragment housed at the Museum of Comparative Zoology, Harvard University, there are published reports of even larger specimens. On the subject of endocerid size, nautiloid specialist Rousseau H. Flower wrote:

They are not all large, by any means, but specimens twelve feet [] in length have been collected, and fragments of greater diameter indicate a much greater maximum length.

However, the uncoiled length of the largest ammonites far exceeds that of even these giant endocerids. In terms of mass, these are the largest known invertebrates that have ever lived, though perhaps still second to the largest living cephalopods when considering tissue mass alone, since in shell-bearing species the vast majority of the living tissue is restricted to the body chamber, which occupies only a fraction of the internal shell volume. They might also be the largest—or at least longest—shell-bearing animals that have ever lived.

Historical claims

Misidentifications

The maximum sizes of certain cephalopod species, most notably the giant squid and giant Pacific octopus, have often been misreported and exaggerated. The literature on cephalopod size has been further muddied by the frequent misattribution of various squid specimens to the giant squid genus Architeuthis, often based solely on their large size. In the academic literature alone, such misidentifications encompass at least the oegopsid families Chiroteuthidae, Cranchiidae, Ommastrephidae, Onychoteuthidae, and Psychroteuthidae. This situation is further confused by the occasional usage of the common name 'giant squid' in reference to large squids of other genera.

Perhaps the most notable misidentification relates to a photograph taken some time before 1993 by diver H. Kubota off southern Japan. The image shows a large individual of Onykia robusta (previously known as Moroteuthis robusta), which appears to be sick or dying, alongside a diver in shallow water. A video of the same animal appeared in a Japanese made-for-television film. The image was published in the 1993 book European Seashells by Guido T. Poppe and Yoshihiro Goto, where it was identified as Architeuthis dux, the giant squid, and said to have been taken in the North Atlantic. If true, this image would represent the first known photograph of a live giant squid. In The Search for the Giant Squid (1998), Richard Ellis wrote:

For a moment, I thought that some obscure photograph had captured the most elusive image in natural history. Fortunately for those who have devoted their lives to searching for Architeuthis, this was only an aberration, a case of mistaken identity.

It would be more than a decade before the true first photographs of a live giant squid in the wild were taken on 30 September 2004 by Tsunemi Kubodera and Kyoichi Mori. Kubodera and his team subsequently became the first to film a live adult giant squid on 4 December 2006, and the first to film a live giant squid in its natural habitat in July 2012. These milestones were preceded by the first footage of a live (paralarval) giant squid in 2001, and the first image of a live adult giant squid on 15 January 2002. Since then, live giant squid have been photographed and filmed on a number of occasions.

Giant squid

Reports of giant squid (Architeuthis dux) specimens reaching or even exceeding  in total length are widespread, but no animals approaching this size have been scientifically documented in recent times. This is despite there being hundreds of specimens available for study ( 700 documented as of 2015, of which  460 measured in some way), including numerous recent examples, such as the 57 specimens recorded from Japanese waters over a 15-month period in 2014–2015. It is now thought likely that such lengths were achieved by great lengthening of the two long feeding tentacles, analogous to stretching elastic bands, or resulted from inadequate measurement methods such as pacing.

On the subject of the oft-cited maximum size of 18 metres—or 60 feet—Dery (2013) quoted giant squid experts Steve O'Shea and Clyde Roper:

If this figure [45 ft or ] seems a little short of the Brobdingnagian claims made for Architeuthis in most pop-science stories about the animal, that's probably because virtually every general-interest article dutifully repeats the magic number of 60 feet.

Steve O'Shea deplores the media's perpetuation of what he believes to be a credulity-straining exaggeration, based on the 19th-century biologist Thomas Kirk's eyeball estimate of a specimen's length. In a comment on the final draft of this article, O'Shea wrote, "Kirk paced it, in his own words, for he had no ruler/measure handy, and I believe this misrepresentation has been perpetuated enough; if they were foot-on-foot, as in heel directly to toe, I would accept 57 (or 58, whatever the precise figure was), but I think perpetuating this as fact any longer is doing a disservice to science."

Roper, in his comments on the final draft of this article, was even more conservative, writing, "there are no confirmed records of giant squid longer than about 45 feet [] total length. Most are in the 25–35-foot [] range. I have examined specimens in museums and laboratories around the world—perhaps a 100 or so—and I believe the 60-foot number comes from fear, fantasy, and pulling the highly elastic tentacles out to the near breaking point when they are measured on the shore or on deck."

Largest reported animals

Paxton (2016a) investigated the maximum size of Architeuthis by performing a statistical analysis using data from literature records of giant squid specimens. He selected what he regarded as the largest size records for each of mantle length (ML), standard length (SL), and total length (TL). Paxton's study has been criticised by giant squid experts, who have called into question the reliability of some of the selected literature records.

For mantle length, Paxton (2016a:83) considered the  reported by Dell (1952:98) as the "longest measured", though "more reliably" the  ML specimen from Lyall Bay, New Zealand, documented by Kirk (1880:312). Paxton added: "A  specimen from Mauritius is often mistakenly cited but consultation of the primary paper (Staub, 1993) reveals an ill-defined length which is clearly not ML." A more modest  ML is also given, based on a sighting in the Indian Ocean sourced to the TV documentary of Lynch (2013).

Among specimens recovered from sperm whales, the longest "definitely measured" SL is the  reported by Clarke (1956:257) and the longest "visually estimated" SL is the   attributed to a photograph of a sperm whale with giant squid remains in its jaws, though Paxton conceded that it is "[n]ot clear how much/what portion of body was eaten". Paxton treated these last two size estimates as SLs as opposed to TLs because "squid do not generally leave their tentacles exposed except when grabbing prey and this appears to be the case for Architeuthis".

For total length, Paxton (2016a:83) considered three records as candidates for the "longest measured": the  specimen of Berzin (1972:199), the  specimen described by Kirk (1888) as Architeuthis longimanus—a strangely proportioned animal that has been much commented on—and the  "Thimble Tickle specimen" reported by Verrill (1880a:191), which is often cited as the largest giant squid ever recorded. Of the last one, Paxton wrote: "Sometimes mistakenly cited as  but the source is clear that it is 55 ft long." The first two records, particularly that of Berzin, are more questionable, as Paxton explained:

The accuracy of the two longest measured TLs of 19 and 16.81 m from a specimen found in the gut of a sperm whale from the Indian Ocean and from the specimen from New Zealand in 1887, respectively, should also be questioned but again are certainly not impossible. The New Zealand specimen (named Architeuthis longimanus Kirk, 1888) clearly has the largest ratio of TL to ML ever known in Architeuthis [...] which led [O'Shea & Bolstad, 2008] to suggest that the length was paced out and/or there was extensive post-mortem stretching. However, a re-reading of the original paper suggests that the specimen, although initially paced out, was actually measured, nevertheless the TL is at the edge of the 99.9% prediction interval range [...] and so it was certainly an unusual specimen. Berzin's (1972) Indian Ocean claim is suspect because of the roundness of the figure, the lack of detailed measurements and because in an associated photo, the mantle (whose length was not given) does not look very large compared to the men in the image. Consequently the measurement, if accurate, would represent another animal with very long tentacles.

However, as Paxton (2016a:86) pointed out, the genetic analysis of Winkelmann et al. (2013)—which concluded that there is likely a single, globally-distributed species of Architeuthis—did not encompass these two specimens, and it is therefore possible that there exists a second, as yet unsampled, giant squid species with proportionately longer tentacles.

The  total length of the Berzin specimen was later confirmed to be erroneous; according to Valentin Yukhov, who was involved in the specimen's discovery, it should have read . The misprint was reproduced in the English translation published the following year and was later propagated in a number of papers on giant squid. With the Berzin specimen not being as large as originally reported, the longest giant squid recovered from a sperm whale is the  TL individual recorded by Clarke (1956:257) (this specimen also has the longest confirmed ML and SL of any giant squid from a sperm whale). Paxton considered the "longest visually estimated" TL to be the  published by Murray (1874:121), from an eyewitness account by fisherman Theophilus Picot, who claimed to have struck the floating animal from his boat, causing it to attack. Picot managed to hack off one of its tentacles, which was subsequently examined by a number of authors.

Perhaps the largest of all recorded giant squid specimens was the one found floating at the surface off Saint-Gilles, Réunion, on 4 March 2016. Although due to its great size the specimen could not be retrieved in its entirety, the head and arm crown were saved. Crucially, this meant the beak could be measured to estimate the mantle length and total length of the specimen.

Supposed sucker scars

More extreme and outlandish giant squid size claims—belonging firmly in the realm of cryptozoology—have appeared in the works of authors such as Bernard Heuvelmans, Willy Ley, and Ivan T. Sanderson. The existence of these gargantuan squids is often supported by reference to the giant circular scars sometimes found on sperm whales, which are assumed to have been inflicted by the suckers of struggling giant squid. Sometimes these claims are accompanied by extrapolations of body size based on the isometric upscaling of a "typical" giant squid. However, such scars are not necessarily of squid origin and may instead represent fungal growths or bite marks, with sea lampreys (Petromyzon marinus) being one possible source. Even in the case of genuine giant squid sucker marks it is possible that subsequent skin growth has enlarged them well beyond their original dimensions.

Nevertheless, claims of enormous sucker scars are widespread in the literature. Richard Ellis collected some of "the more egregious examples" in his book, The Search for the Giant Squid. These include the claim of Dozier (1976) that "an ordinary giant squid of 50 feet [] leaves teeth-ringed sucker marks measuring between three and four inches [] across on a whale, but sperm whales have been captured with tentacle marks 18 inches [] across." L. Harrison Matthews's monographic treatment of the sperm whale, published in 1938, includes the following: "Nearly all male Sperm whales carry scars caused by the suckers and claws of large squids, scars caused by suckers up to 10 cm. [] in diameter being common. The claw marks take the form of scratches 2–3 m. [] in length, and appear to be of more frequent occurrence than sucker marks". Ellis (1998a:142) wrote that this 10 cm figure is "so much larger than any other recorded sucker dimensions that one suspects some sort of error, either in measuring or in transcription."

The subject was covered in some detail by Wood (1982:192):

Ivan Sanderson (1956) goes even further and claims that sucker marks over  have been found on the heads of cachalots, but he does not explain how the poor whales managed to escape from the clutches of such colossi!

Perhaps the most extreme published claim, ridiculed by Ellis (1998a:142), appeared in Willy Ley's 1959 book, Exotic Zoology: "Toothed whales, vomiting in death struggle, have shown evidence of still larger kraken; in one case a 6-foot [] piece of tentacle, with a diameter of 2 feet [; emphasis in original], has been claimed. Another claim goes for marks on the skin of such a whale, looking like the mark of a sucking disk over 2 feet [] in diameter".

Marine biologist Frederick Aldrich, who personally examined more than a dozen giant squid specimens, wrote that his largest specimen from Newfoundland bore tentacular suckers "approximately two inches [] in diameter" but that "[s]uckers and their toothed armament of over twelve inches [] in diameter have been found in the stomachs of sperm whale as indigestible wastes".

By comparison, giant squid suckers normally reach a maximum diameter of only a few centimetres. Based on a detailed examination of a number of large specimens from New Zealand waters, Förch (1998:55) wrote that "[t]he largest suckers [...] on the sessile arms are a very constant  in external diameter". According to Roper & Boss (1982:97), the largest suckers of the tentacular clubs reach  in diameter.

Mass estimates

It is now accepted that the giant squid has a maximum mass of several hundred kilograms, but the literature is rife with claims of much greater weights. Similarly, Richard Ellis wrote: "Where [giant] squid carcasses have actually been weighed, it appears that the longest ones—in the 50-foot [] range, for example—weigh about a ton []." It would have weighed about 42 tons []." They added that a  specimen, such as the one reported from Thimble Tickle, "would have weighed 29 or 30 tons [] including the tentacles—a truly noble animal, being a little more than one-fifth the weight of the largest whale and larger than the whale sharks and basking sharks, the largest of all fishes". Ellis characterised these estimates as "unfounded exaggerations". In the revised edition of Natural History of Marine Animals, published in 1968, the authors reduced their estimate to less than 8 tonnes.

Bernard Heuvelmans believed that "there must be Architeuthis weighing more than 5 tons, and some even larger ones which must weigh between 2 and 27 tons, the normal weight being around 8 tons. There are good reasons to believe that there may even exist specimens twice as long as that of Thimble Tickle, which, depending upon their girth, might have weighed between 16 and 216 tons, but more likely around 64 tons." Ellis, who considered these estimates "utterly ridiculous", wrote:

Heuvelmans commits a fundamental error in calculating the weight of some of these monsters when he writes that "the density of living creatures is only slightly higher than that of water ... a decimetre of living flesh weighs about as much as a litre of water." That may be true for some other living creatures, but the flesh of Architeuthis, saturated with ammonium chloride, is lighter than water, and the giant squid is neutrally buoyant. (This is believed to be the reason that dead or dying squid are found floating at the surface or washed up on the beach.) His assumption, therefore, that the 55-foot-long [] Thimble Tickle squid would have "probably weighed near 24 tons" is patently erroneous.

On the subject of the Thimble Tickle specimen's mass, Wood (1982:190) referred to the work of Soviet zoologist and writer Igor Akimushkin:

Since there is a cubic relationship between the linear dimensions of Architeuthis and its volume or weight, this means the Thimble Tickle monster must have scaled about 2.8 tonnes [] (i.e. the weight of a large bull hippopotamus), although 2 tonnes [] is probably a more realistic figure.

Giant Pacific octopus
The maximum size of the giant Pacific octopus (Enteroctopus dofleini) has long been a source of debate in the scientific community, with dubious reports of specimens weighing hundreds of kilograms.

Largest reported animals

In 1885, reporting on the longest octopus specimen reliably recorded up to that point, renowned malacologist William Healey Dall wrote:

In 1874 I speared an octopus in the harbor of Iliuliuk, Unalashka, which was afterward hung, by a cord tied around the body immediately behind the arms, to one of the stern davits of the coast survey vessel under my command. As soon as the animal died and the muscles relaxed, I noticed that the tips of the longer tentacles just touched the water. On measuring the distance with a cord, I found it to be sixteen feet [], giving the creature a spread from tip to tip of the longest pair of arms, of not less than thirty-two feet []. The arms toward the tips were all exceedingly slender, but rather stout toward the body, which was somewhat over a foot [] long. The largest suckers were two and a half inches [] in diameter; the whole creature nearly filled a large washtub. Parts of this specimen are now in the U. S. national museum.

In an article for the National Marine Fisheries Service summarising knowledge on the giant Pacific octopus, High (1976:17–18) wrote:

Several octopuses in excess of 100 pounds [] have been encountered and captured. Much larger ones have been reported but, like the Loch Ness Monster, these usually elude the careful photographer or scientist. Most octopuses weigh less than 70 pounds [] with a stretched length of 15 feet [] or less. Overall length between arms is not a suitable measure because of the animal's unusual elasticity.

In the late 1950s, I interviewed a Canadian commercial diver, Jock MacLean of Prince Rupert, B.C. He reported capturing an immense creature weighing 600 pounds [] and measuring 32 feet [] from arm tip to top. MacLean's photographs, unfortunately, were of poor quality. Smaller animals, to 400 pounds [], were occasionally taken in his commercial octopus fishing endeavor.

Hochberg & Fields (1980:436) referenced the same specimen, writing: "the largest specimen on record with a total arm spread of 9.6 m [] and a weight of 272 kg []". These figures are only estimates, however, as—contrary to the above quotation from High (1976:17–18)—it appears that this specimen was never collected and measured. Murray Newman, director of the Vancouver Aquarium for 37 years, quoted Jock MacLean in his 1994 memoir, Life in a Fishbowl: "Next year [1957] in the same place, I saw one, maybe thirty-two feet [] across and six hundred pounds []. Didn't go for her, though, no place to keep her!" Nevertheless, the misleadingly precise metric conversion of 272 kg (for 600 lb) and the imprecise conversion of 9.6 m (for 32 ft; naively employing a conversion factor of 0.3 instead of 0.3048) gained wide acceptance as the maximum recorded dimensions of the giant Pacific octopus, and have been much repeated.

Jock MacLean is also reported to have captured a  animal with an arm span of  near Port Hardy, British Columbia, in March 1956. Another giant specimen was caught off Santa Barbara, California, in 1945. In a book dedicated to the giant Pacific octopus, Cosgrove & McDaniel (2009:72) summarised knowledge on the species's maximum size as follows:

The specimen William Dall speared in 1885  at Iliuliuk had the largest radial span of any giant Pacific octopus ever measured. Jock MacLean's 1956 Port Hardy behemoth was the biggest ever weighed. The Santa Barbara specimen photographed in 1945 was the second heaviest.

Possible diminution in size
No specimens approaching these extreme sizes have been reported since the middle of the 20th century. In an attempt to raise a truly enormous specimen, Anderson fed a number of captive males ad libitum. Anderson suggested the species might now be maturing at a smaller size as a result of toxicant bioaccumulation, which could explain the lack of truly gigantic specimens in recent times. In particular, high concentrations of heavy metals and PCBs have been identified in the digestive glands of wild giant Pacific octopuses, likely originating from their preferred prey, the red rock crab (Cancer productus). A preliminary study found that aquarium animals fed equal quantities of raw sea food and live C. productus (caught locally in Elliott Bay) matured at a smaller size, reached a lower maximum weight ( mean), and had higher concentrations of most heavy metals, than those fed solely on raw sea food ( mean, including the aforementioned  specimen).

Largest species by measure
Cephalopod size can be quantified in various ways. Some of the most common size measures are covered below. The following four tables list only extant species; extinct taxa are treated separately at the end.

Mantle length

The list of largest cephalopods by mantle length is dominated by squids, with more than twenty species exceeding the largest-bodied octopuses and cuttlefish. Even greater mantle lengths have historically been reported for the giant squid (Architeuthis dux), but these have been discredited (see O'Shea & Bolstad, 2008).

{| class="wikitable"
|-
!colspan="4" style="background-color:silver;text-align:center;" id="Teuthida (squids)"| Teuthida (squids)
|- style="background-color:#cccccc;"
! scope="col" width="15%" | Species
! scope="col" width="15%" | Maximum mantle length
! scope="col" width="15%" | References
! scope="col" width="55%" | Notes
|-
| Mesonychoteuthis hamiltoni(colossal squid) || ≈300 cm (estimate) || Roper & Jereb (2010c:173) || The largest complete specimen, a mature female recovered from the Ross Sea in February 2007, had a mantle length of around 2.5 m ([Anonymous])—this being the maximum scientifically documented mantle length (Rosa et al., 2017)—and several other specimens near this size have been recorded. However, at 42.5 mm LRL, its beak is considerably smaller than the largest recovered from a sperm whale stomach (49 mm LRL; O'Shea & Bolstad, 2008; [Anonymous]). Maximum mantle lengths as great as 4 m have been estimated and reported in the past (Young, 2003; O'Shea & Bolstad, 2008). There are published claims of a very large section of gladius that would suggest a colossal squid measuring 5 m or more in mantle length (Wood, 1982:191; Bright, 1989:146).
|-
| Galiteuthis phyllura || ? 265–275 cm (estimate) || Nesis (1985); Nesis (1987:274); Ellis (1998a:149); Glaubrecht & Salcedo-Vargas (2004:65); Hoving & Robison (2017:47) || Estimate based on 40 cm long arm and 115 cm tentacle from the Sea of Okhotsk.{{refn|group=nb|name=Galiteuthis|Ellis (1998a:148–149) wrote of this specimen:

The Russian vessel Novoulianovsk, working in the Sea of Okhotsk in 1984, brought up the remains of a gigantic specimen of Galiteuthis phyllura from a depth of one thousand to thirteen hundred meters (thirty-three hundred to forty-three hundred feet), and Nesis (1985) said that it was "almost as large as Mesonychoteuthis hamiltoni (of the same family)." "Because of its narrow body," wrote Nesis, "we conclude that its mass is consistently lower than that of the other large squids."

Roper & Jereb (2010c:165) questioned the validity of this record, writing: "this is considered a doubtful record that might refer to total length; probably the maximum mantle length is less than 400 to 500 mm". But Steve O'Shea commented:

<blockquote>The late, great Kir Nesis was not one to exaggerate, and must have had very good reason to cite a possible mantle length of 2.7m [] for Galiteuthis phyllura. Not only would such a monstrous mantle render this the 'largest species of Galiteuthis''', but it would give the species a mantle that was considerably longer than that of Architeuthis, and marginally longer (0.2m []) than the submature Colossal Squid (Mesonychoteuthis) we reported last year [in 2003].
What amazes me is that the adult has never made the press (that I am aware of). Even if Galiteuthis lacks hooks on the arms it would still be a most frightening squid to bump into in the abyss. (O'Shea, 2004b)</blockquote>}} Roper & Jereb (2010c:165) write: "this is considered a doubtful record that might refer to total length; probably the maximum mantle length is less than 400 to 500 mm".
|-
| Architeuthis dux(giant squid) || 240 cm (female) || Landman et al. (2004:686); O'Shea (2006); Roper & Shea (2013:114) || Dorsal mantle length of female captured off Tasmania, Australia, reported by Landman et al. (2004:686) and cited by Roper & Shea (2013:114). Questionable records of up to 500 cm ML can be found in older literature (Roper & Jereb, 2010a:121). O'Shea & Bolstad (2008) give a maximum mantle length of 225 cm based on the examination of more than 130 specimens, as well as beaks recovered from sperm whales (which do not exceed the size of those found in the largest complete specimens). Paxton (2016a) accepts a maximum recorded ML of 279 cm, based on the Lyall Bay specimen reported by Kirk (1880:312), but this record has been called into question as the gladius of this specimen—which should approximate the mantle in length—was said to be only 190 cm long (Greshko, 2016).
|-
| Onykia robusta(robust clubhook squid) || 200 cm  || Norman (2000:174); Bolstad (2008:107); Okutani (2015b) || Kubodera et al. (1998) give a maximum of at least 161.5 cm ML. The largest specimen seen by Bolstad (2008:107) had a mantle length of 197 cm (USNM 816872; specimen of indeterminate sex from ). Nesis (1987:192) likewise gave a maximum mantle length of 230 cm, but Roper & Jereb (2010i:364) wrote that "this old record might be in error", with the species commonly growing to 160 cm ML. Previously known as Moroteuthis robusta (see Bolstad, 2008; Bolstad, 2010).
|-
| Megalocranchia maxima || 185 cm (female) || Kubodera & Horikawa (2005:210) || Size of female caught off Motobu Peninsula, Okinawa, Japan, identified as "Megalocranchia cf. maxima" (see Kubodera & Horikawa, 2005:223 for photograph). This species is listed under the name Megalocranchia fisheri in many older sources. Tsuchiya & Okutani (1993), Roper & Jereb (2010c:171) and Okutani (2015a) give maximum of 180 cm, and Norman (2000:158) gives the same for M. fisheri. This species may also be conspecific with Megalocranchia abyssicola (Glaubrecht & Salcedo-Vargas, 2004:65).
|-
| Taningia danae(Dana octopus squid) || 170 cm || Nesis (1982); Roper & Jereb (2010h:266) || The largest well documented specimen is a 160 cm ML mature female from the North Atlantic (Roper & Vecchione, 1993:449).
|-
| Dosidicus gigas(Humboldt squid) || 150 cm || Wormuth (1976:38); Norman (2000:165); Glaubrecht & Salcedo-Vargas (2004:54) || According to Wormuth (1976:38), specimens reaching 150 cm ML are "not uncommon" off Peru. Roper et al. (2010b:301) give a maximum mantle length of 120 cm for specimens off Chile and around 100 cm for northern populations, with a more typical mantle length of up to 50–80 cm. The review article of Nigmatullin et al. (2001)—based on  230 published papers on the species, in addition to other catch data—also gives a maximum mantle length of 120 cm.
|-
| Kondakovia longimana(giant warty squid) || ≈150 cm (estimate; female) || Bolstad (2008:171) || Estimated size of damaged female (NMV F109447; specimen with 21 mm LRL from ). O'Shea (2003b) estimated maximum mantle length as probably exceeding 115 cm. Largest complete specimen measured 108 cm ML (Lynnes & Rodhouse, 2002:1087; Roper & Jereb, 2010i:366).
|-
| Mastigoteuthis cordiformis || 100 cm or more || Roper & Jereb (2010g:253) || Based on unpublished reports; largest verified ML is 70 cm (Roper & Jereb, 2010g:253).
|-
| Lepidoteuthis grimaldii(Grimaldi scaled squid) || 100 cm || Roper & Jereb (2010e:240) || 
|-
| Thysanoteuthis rhombus(diamondback squid) || 100 cm || Nesis (1987:237); Norman (2000:175); Roper et al. (1984); Roper & Jereb (2010k:385) || Commonly grows to 60 cm ML (Roper et al., 1984) and possibly reaches 130 cm ML (Roper & Jereb, 2010k:385). Both sexes are the same size.
|-
| cf. Magnapinna(bigfin squid) || ≈100 cm (estimate) || Vecchione et al. (2001a:2505); Vecchione et al. (2001b) || Estimate based on specimen observed by ROV Tiburon in May 2001, north of Oahu, Hawaii, at a depth of 3380 m. Its total length was estimated at 4–5 m.
|-
| Loligo forbesii(veined squid) || 93.7 cm (male) || Jereb et al. (2010:44) || Maximum size of specimens from the Azores. Females from same location grow to 46.2 cm ML. Individuals from the Mediterranean Sea and eastern North Atlantic are usually 20–30 cm ML.
|-
| Asperoteuthis acanthoderma || 92 cm || Kubodera & Horikawa (2005:209) || Size of specimen (undetermined sex) caught off Motobu Peninsula, Okinawa, Japan (see Kubodera & Horikawa, 2005:223 for photograph). Roper & Jereb (2010b:140) give maximum mantle length of 80 cm.
|-
| Ommastrephes bartramii(neon flying squid) || 80–90 cm (female) || Roper et al. (2010b:296) || Maximum size of specimens from North Atlantic and Southern Hemisphere (where males reach 40–42 cm). Females from the North Pacific are smaller (50–60 cm ML), but males may be larger (40–45 cm ML) (Roper et al., 2010b:296). Nesis (1987:231) and Glaubrecht & Salcedo-Vargas (2004:62) give maximum mantle length of 86 cm.
|-
| Onykia robsoni(rugose hooked squid) || 88.5 cm (female) || Vecchione et al. (2011) || Size of mature female (11.1 kg total weight) caught in bottom trawl at 685–700 m depth over Chatham Rise. Roper & Jereb (2010i:363) give maximum mantle length of 75 cm. Previously known as Moroteuthis robsoni (see Bolstad, 2008; Bolstad, 2010).
|-
| Sthenoteuthis oualaniensis(purpleback flying squid) || 82 cm (female) || Roper et al. (2010b:317) || Size of exceptionally large mature female of giant form, captured in the Gulf of Guinea. Males of this giant form reach 24–32 cm ML and females are more typically 36–65 cm. Medium-sized and dwarf forms of this species are also known. For more on the giant form of this species, see Snÿder (1995) and Snÿder (1998).
|-
| Megalocranchia oceanica || 81 cm || Roper & Jereb (2010c:172) || 
|-
| Pholidoteuthis adami || 78 cm || Roper & Jereb (2010j:373) || 
|-
| Todarodes sagittatus || 75 cm || Roper et al. (2010b:323) || Size of unsexed specimen from North Atlantic, likely a female. Maximum reported mantle length for males is 64.0 cm, also from North Atlantic. More commonly this species reaches 25.0–35.0 cm ML.
|-
| Pholidoteuthis massyae || 72 cm || Roper & Jereb (2010j:371) || 
|-
| Taonius pavo || 66 cm || Roper & Jereb (2010c:159) || 
|-
| Sthenoteuthis pteropus(orangeback flying squid) || 65 cm || Nesis (1987:237); Glaubrecht & Salcedo-Vargas (2004:62); Roper et al. (2010b:320) || Maximum size of large form is 30–65 cm ML for females and 18.0–28.0 cm ML for males. A small, early-maturing, equatorial form is also known.
|-
| Loligo vulgaris || 64 cm (male) || Jereb et al. (2010:41) || Largest individuals found off West African coast. Maximum recorded mantle length for females is 48.5 cm.
|-
| Gonatopsis japonicus || 62 cm || Roper et al. (2010a:216) || 
|-
| Galiteuthis armata || 61 cm || Roper & Jereb (2010c:164) || 
|-
| Cycloteuthis akimushkini || 60 cm || Roper & Jereb (2010d:181) || 
|-
| Gonatus kamtschaticus || 55 cm || Roper et al. (2010a:204) || 
|-
| Todarodes filippovae || 54 cm (female) || Roper et al. (2010b:327) || Maximum mantle length in males is around 40 cm. Species more commonly reaches a mantle length of 20–40 cm.
|-
| Taonius belone || ≈53 cm || Roper & Jereb (2010c:160) || 
|-
| Onykia ingens || 52 cm || Roper & Jereb (2010i:359) || Previously known as Moroteuthis ingens (see Bolstad, 2008; Bolstad, 2010).
|-
| Uroteuthis edulis || 50.2 cm (male) || Jereb et al. (2010:101) || Maximum recorded mantle length for females is 41.0 cm. Commercially caught specimens are typically much smaller, averaging 15–25 cm ML.
|-
| Galiteuthis glacialis || 50 cm || Roper & Jereb (2010c:165) || 
|-
| Todarodes pacificus || 50 cm || Roper et al. (2010b:329) || Commonly reaches 30 cm ML in temperate Japan, but less than 20 cm ML off Hong Kong and in the South China Sea.
|-
| Uroteuthis singhalensis || 50 cm (male) || Jereb et al. (2010:113) || Maximum recorded mantle length for females is 31 cm.
|-
| Cycloteuthis sirventi || ≈50 cm || Roper & Jereb (2010d:180) || 
|-
| Taonius borealis || ≈50 cm || Roper & Jereb (2010c:160) || 
|-
| Octopoteuthis sicula || possibly to 50 cm || Roper & Jereb (2010h:264) || Usually reaches 20 cm ML.
|-
!colspan="4" style="background-color:silver;text-align:center;" id="Octopoda (octopuses)"| Octopoda (octopuses)
|- style="background-color:#cccccc;"
! scope="col" width="15%" | Species
! scope="col" width="15%" | Maximum mantle length
! scope="col" width="15%" | References
! scope="col" width="55%" | Notes
|-
| Haliphron atlanticus(seven-arm octopus) || 69 cm (female) || O'Shea (2002:1); O'Shea (2004a:9); Finn (2014a:227) || Mantle length of incomplete 2.90 m TL mature female, measured defrosted and wet, prior to fixing. Isolated beaks of comparable size to that of this specimen were recorded by Clarke (1986:247–248). The sexually dimorphic males reach a mantle length of over 10 cm (Finn, 2014a:227).
|-
| Enteroctopus dofleini(giant Pacific octopus) || at least 60 cm || Norman (2000:214); Norman et al. (2014:124) || 
|-
!colspan="4" style="background-color:silver;text-align:center;" id="Sepiida (cuttlefish)"| Sepiida (cuttlefish)
|- style="background-color:#cccccc;"
! scope="col" width="15%" | Species
! scope="col" width="15%" | Maximum mantle length
! scope="col" width="15%" | References
! scope="col" width="55%" | Notes
|-
| Sepia apama(Australian giant cuttlefish) || 50 cm || Reid et al. (2005:68) || 
|-
| Sepia latimanus(broadclub cuttlefish) || 50 cm || Reid et al. (2005:92) ||
|-
| Sepia hierredda || <50 cm || Reid et al. (2005:88) ||
|-
| Sepia officinalis(European common cuttlefish) || 49 cm || Reid et al. (2005:99) || 
|-
| Sepia pharaonis(pharaoh cuttlefish) || 42 cm || Reid et al. (2005:107) || 
|-
| Sepia lycidas(kisslip cuttlefish) || 38 cm || Reid et al. (2005:96) || 
|-
| Sepia ramani || 37.5 cm || Reid et al. (2005:114) || 
|-
!colspan="4" style="background-color:silver;text-align:center;" id="Vampyromorphida (vampire squid)"| Vampyromorphida (vampire squid) – single extant species
|- style="background-color:#cccccc;"
! scope="col" width="15%" | Species
! scope="col" width="15%" | Maximum mantle length
! scope="col" width="15%" | References
! scope="col" width="55%" | Notes
|-
| Vampyroteuthis infernalis(vampire squid) || 13 cm || Nesis (1982); Norman & Finn (2014:269) ||
|-
!colspan="4" style="background-color:silver;text-align:center;" id="Sepiolida (bobtail squids)"| Sepiolida (bobtail squids)
|- style="background-color:#cccccc;"
! scope="col" width="15%" | Species
! scope="col" width="15%" | Maximum mantle length
! scope="col" width="15%" | References
! scope="col" width="55%" | Notes
|-
| Austrorossia antillensis || 9 cm || Reid & Jereb (2005:192) || 
|-
| Rossia pacifica || 9 cm (female) || Reid & Jereb (2005:185) || Males grow to 4.5 cm in mantle length.
|-
| Rossia macrosoma || 8.5 cm || Reid & Jereb (2005:184) || More typically the mantle length is 2.0–6.0 cm.
|-
| Neorossia caroli || 8.3 cm (female) || Reid & Jereb (2005:190) || Males grow to 5.1 cm in mantle length.
|-
!colspan="4" style="background-color:silver;text-align:center;" id="Spirulida (spirula)"| Spirulida (spirula) – single extant species
|- style="background-color:#cccccc;"
! scope="col" width="15%" | Species
! scope="col" width="15%" | Maximum mantle length
! scope="col" width="15%" | References
! scope="col" width="55%" | Notes
|-
| Spirula spirula(ram's horn squid) || rarely exceeds 4.5 cm || Reid (2005:211) || 
|}

Total length

Despite its proportionally shorter tentacles, the colossal squid may rival the giant squid in total length, but the species's size limits are uncertain because only a handful of mature specimens have been recorded.

Mass

The heaviest known cephalopod, and the largest living invertebrate, is the colossal squid. However, its beak is not the largest known from this species; even bigger colossal squid beaks have been recovered from the stomachs of sperm whales, indicating that this species can grow larger still.

Shell diameter

Nautiluses are the only extant cephalopods with a true external shell; in other groups the shell has been internalised or lost completely. Internal shells include the cuttlebones of cuttlefish, the gladii of squids and the vampire squid, the winged shells of cirrate octopods, and the spiral shells of Spirula. Additionally, females of the octopus genus Argonauta secrete a specialised paper-thin eggcase in which they reside, and this is popularly regarded as a "shell", although it is not attached to the body of the animal (see Finn, 2013).

Cephalopod shell diameter is of interest to teuthologists and conchologists alike. The Registry of World Record Size Shells, the most comprehensive publication on maximum shell size in marine molluscs, specifies that specimens "should be measured with vernier type calipers and should reflect the greatest measurable dimension of the shell in any direction including any processes of hard shell material produced by the animal (i.e. spines, wings, keels, siphonal canals, etc.) and not including attachments, barnacles, coralline algae, or any other encrusting organisms" (Pisor, 2008:14). Unlike most other measures of cephalopod size, shell diameter can be determined with a high degree of precision and usually leaves little room for ambiguity. For this reason it is usually recorded to the nearest one-tenth of a millimetre, as is standard in conchology.

When the Registry of World Record Size Shells changed ownership in 2008 it was launched as an online database in addition to its print publication. Subsequent rule changes meant that all records required photographic verification. Over time, older records for which photographic evidence could not be obtained were removed from the database. As a result, some records from older editions of the registry actually exceed the size of the current official record holders, sometimes by considerable margins. Where this has occurred, the largest recorded size across all editions is shown first and any discrepancies or competing records are noted thereafter. Where a reliable literature record surpasses all specimens ever included in the registry, this is given instead and the registry record(s) noted thereafter. Pisor (2008) was the fifth and final print edition of the registry published prior to the rule change, and Barbier et al. is the current, continuously updated online database. The registry only covers the shells of nautiluses and Spirula and the eggcases of Argonauta.

Extinct taxa

Anatomical superlatives

Eyes

The giant and colossal squids have the largest recorded eyes of any living animal, with a maximum diameter of at least  and a  pupil.

Despite their size, the eyes of giant and colossal squids do not appear to be disproportionately large; they do not deviate significantly from the allometric relationship seen across other squid species. Sepiolids are noted for having exceptionally large eyes, which are much bigger relative to their mantle length than those of the giant squid; the same is true of Histioteuthis species. Gonatids and the loliginids Loligo and Lolliguncula also have proportionately somewhat larger eyes than Architeuthis.

There is some debate in the scientific community as to the evolutionary reason behind the extremely large eyes of giant and colossal squids. Nilsson et al. (2012) and Nilsson et al. (2013) argue that it is an anti-predator adaptation for enhanced detection of sperm whales, with the squids picking up plankton bioluminescence triggered by moving whales, perhaps from distances exceeding . Schmitz et al. (2013a) and Schmitz et al. (2013b) contend that their eyes are so large due to a phylogenetically conserved developmental pattern that governs the relative dimensions of squids and their eyes, and that any fitness benefits their size may confer in terms of predator avoidance are the result of exaptation ("pre-adaptation").

Neurons

Squid giant axons can exceed  in diameter: 100 to 1000 times the thickness of mammalian axons. Such was the importance of Humboldt squid to electrophysiology research that when the animals migrated out of reach of Chilean fishermen in the 1970s "it led to the demise of a world-class electrophysiology laboratory" based there.

The squid giant synapse is the largest chemical junction in nature. It lies in the stellate ganglion on each side of the midline, at the posterior wall of the squid's muscular mantle. Activation of this synapse triggers a synchronous contraction of the mantle musculature, causing the forceful ejection of a jet of water from the mantle. This water propulsion allows the squid to move rapidly through the water and, in the case of the so-called 'flying squids', even to jump through the surface of the water (breaking the air–water barrier) to escape predators. Many essential elements of how all chemical synapses function were first discovered by studying the squid giant synapse.

PhotophoresTaningia danae, a very large octopoteuthid squid, possesses "lemon-sized" yellow photophores at the tips of two of its arms, which are the largest known light-emitting organs in the animal kingdom. Video footage shot in 2005 in deep water off Japan shows T. danae emitting blinding flashes of light from these photophores as it attacks its prey. A pair of muscular lids surrounds each photophore and it is the withdrawal of these lids that produces the flashes. A large individual filmed from a remote submersible off Hawaii in 2015 can clearly be seen opening the lids to reveal its photophores. It is believed that this highly manoeuvrable squid uses bright flashes to disorientate potential prey. The flashes may also serve to illuminate prey for easier capture or play a role in courtship and/or territorial displays.

Reproductive organs

Extreme penis elongation has been observed in the deep water squid Onykia ingens''. When erect, the penis may be as long as the mantle, head, and arms combined. As such, deep water squids have the greatest known penis length relative to body size of all mobile animals, second in the entire animal kingdom only to certain sessile barnacles.

See also
 Deep-sea gigantism
 Gigantic octopus
 Largest body parts
 Largest organisms
 Largest prehistoric organisms
 List of colossal squid specimens and sightings
 List of giant squid specimens and sightings
 Smallest organisms

Notes

References

Short citations

Full citations

 
 
 
 
 
  
  
  
  
  
  
 
 
  
  
 
  
 
 
  
 
 
 
  
 
  
  
  
  
 
 
 
 
 
 
 
  
  
 
 
  
* 
  
 
 
 
 
 
 
  
 
 
 
 
 
 
 
 
* 
 
 
 
 
 
  
  
  
  
 
 
 
 
 
 
* 
  
 
 
 
 
 
*
 
 
 
 
 
 
 
 
 
 
  
 
 
 
* 
 
 
 
 
 
 
 
 
 
 
 
 
 
 
 
 
 
 
 
 
 
 
 
  
  
  
  
  
 
 
 
 
 
 
 
 
 
 
 
 
  
 
 
 
 
 
 
 
 
 
 
 
 
 
 
 
 
 
 
 
 
 
 
 
 
 
 
 
 
 
* 
 
 
 
 
 
 
 
 
 
  
 
 
 
 
  
  
 
* 
 
 
 
  
* 
 
 
 
 
 
 
 
 
 
 
 
 
 
 
*  
  
 
 
 
  
 
  
 
 
 
 
 
 
 
 
 
 
 
 
  
 
  
 
 
  
 
 
  
 
* 
 
 
 
 
 
 
 
 
 
 
 
 
 
 
 
 
* 
  
  
 
  
 
 
 
 
 
 
 
 
 
 
 
 
 
 
 
 
 
 
 
 
  
 
 
 
 
 
 
 
 
 
 
  
 
* 
 
 
 
 
 
 
 
 
 
 
 
* 
  
 
 
 
 
  
 
 
 
 
 
 
 
 
 
 
 
*
 
 
 
 
 
 
 
  
 
 
 
 
 
 
 
  
  
 
 
  
 
  
 
  
  
 
* 
* 
 
*  
 
 
 
*  
*  
 
 
 
 
 
 
 
 
  
 
 
 
 
 
 
 
  
 
 
 
 
 
 
 
 
 
 
 
 
 
 
 
 
 
 
 
 
 
 
 
 
 
 
 
 
 

 
 
 
 
 
 
 

 
 
 
  
  
 
 
 
 
 
 
 
*  
 
 
*  
 
 
 
 
 
 
*  
 
 
 
 
 
 
 
 
 
 
 
 
  
 
 
 
 
 
 
 
  
  
 
 
 
* 
 
* 
 
 
 
 
 
 
  
  
 
 
  
 
 
 
 
 
 
 
 
 
 
 
 
 
 
 
* 
* 
 
 
 
 
 
 
 
 
 
 
 
 
 
 
 
 
 
*  
*  
 
 
 
 
 
 
 
* 
 
 
 
  
  
  
  
 
 
 
 
 
 
 
  
 
 
 
  
  
 
*

External links

 How big is the colossal squid? — Museum of New Zealand Te Papa Tongarewa
 How big are the biggest squids? — Discovery Channel
 World's Largest Squid — New Zealand Ministry of Fisheries
 How Big Is A Colossal Squid Really? and Whale Sharks and Giant Squids: Big or Bu!!$hit? — Deep Sea News
 Accurately measured lengths of Architeuthis dux — Figshare 

 Discussions at TONMO:
 Giant Cephalopods
 The Largest Ammonite In the World
 The Opposite of Giant
 Really Gigantic Squid? 1. Official Records and Really Gigantic Squid? 2. The Big Ones That Got Away — Malcolm's Musings: Cryptozoology

 Blog entries by Cameron McCormick:
 Mighty Mesonychoteuthis
 How big is the Giant Squid anyways?
 Ludicrous Giant Squid Claims
 The Other Gigantic Squids
 Cephalopod Ageing and Gigantism

Animal size
Biological records
Giant squid
Size